Rakhi Aur Rifle is a 1976 Hindi action film.

Reception

Songs
 "Ek Musibat Khadi Ho Gayi" - Usha Mangeshkar
 "Hansi Meri Le Lo Khushi Meri Le Lo" - Aziz Nazan
 "'Kabhi Kabhi Saiyya Sharab Pike Aaye" - Asha Bhosle
 "Tum Pyare Ho Balam Mohe Praan Se" - Asha Bhosle
 "Ye Rakhi Bhi Pyari Hai" - Asha Bhosle

References

External links
 

Films scored by Sapan-Jagmohan
1976 films
1970s Hindi-language films